Radha Mohan Das Agarwal (born 6 March 1955) is an Indian politician and a Member of Parliament (Rajya Sabha ) from Uttar Pradesh since 5 July 2022 and was a member of the 14th, 15th, 16th and 17th Legislative Assembly of Uttar Pradesh. Since 2002, he represented Gorakhpur Urban (Assembly constituency) as a member of the Bharatiya Janata Party. 

In September 2022, BJP national president J. P. Nadda appointed him as in-charge of BJP in Lakshadweep and as Co-in-charge of BJP in Kerala

He has been made Member of Consultative Committee of Ministry of Finance and  Member Standing Committee of Finance for year 2022-23. He is also appointed as Member of Hindi Advisory Committee of Ministry of Parliamentary Affairs from year 2022 onwards. He is nominated as Member council of National Institute pharmaceutical education and research and member joint parliamentary committee on Jan Vishwas Bill -2022.

Personal life
Dr. Agarwal was born on 6 March 1955 in Gorakhpur to Dau Das Agarwal. He married Ragini Agarwal on 20 January 1988, and  he has a paediatrician daughter. He is also a paediatrician. Agarwal did his MBBS in 1976 and MD in pediatrics 1981, both from the Banaras Hindu University.

Political career
Agrawal's political journey started during his college days, when he joined the Rashtriya Swayamsevak Sangh and then later joined the student politics. He was elected president of Junior Doctors Association in 1974 and later General Secretary of "BHU Teachers Association"(BHUTA). He was then chosen as General Secretary of "Federation of Central University Teacher's Unions" by profession. In 1986, after resigning from Asst. Professor of BHU, he started a clinic in Gorakhpur, which was inaugurated by the National President of the then Janta Party Mr. Chandra Shekhar, who became Prime minister of India. He was given responsibilities to lead "Kashmir Bachao Manch" as Vibhaag Sangyojak, "Swadeshi Jagran Manch" as Vibhaag Sangyojak And "Pragya Prawah" again as Vibhaag Sangyojak. He served as a deputy secretary of "Vishwa Samvad Kendra" at Gorakhprant of RSS.

His political activities started in 1998, when on the invitation of Yogi Adityanath, the then Mahant of Gorakhnath Math. He became his election convenor of Gorakhpur Urban (Assembly constituency), when Yogi was contesting as BJP MP candidate from Gorakhpur for first-time. He was elected as an MLA from Gorakhpur Urban (Vidhan Sabha constituency) in 14th Legislative Assembly of Uttar Pradesh (2002) from ticket of Hindu Mahasabha. He defeated Samajwadi Party candidate Pramod Kumar Tekriwal by a margin of 18,448 (18.67℅) votes.

Before 2007 elections, he joined Bharatiya Janata Party. In 15th Legislative Assembly of Uttar Pradesh (2007) elections, he again contested from Gorakhpur Urban (Assembly constituency) and elected MLA by defeating Bhanu Prakash Mishra (Samajwadi Party) by a margin of 22,392 (24.66℅) votes.

 In his 3rd Vidhan Sabha election (2012) he won by margin of 48,000 and in fourth election 2017 he again increased his margin to 62,000. He's no to establish an  alternative political model in Indian politics as he is known for his simplicity and honesty. A person with self driving his vehicle never carrying a security guard in his political life.

In year 2022, BJP high command decided to have Yogi Adityanath as MLA candidate for Gorakhpur. BJP national president Mr. JP Nadda requested he vacate the seat, which he gladly accepted and complained whole election heartily to ensure his victory.

BJP high command decided his name as BJP candidate of Rajya Sabha election on 31 May 2022 which he won unopposed.

References 
5.  On 2 August 2022 During the discussion on the issue of inflation in the House, BJP Rajya Sabha member Dr. Radha Mohan Das Agrawal said that the world is falling to Modinomics today, 

See the Video link here ....

https://www.youtube.com/watch?v=1Ejiv3iUk6k

1964 births
Living people
People from Gorakhpur
Bharatiya Janata Party politicians from Uttar Pradesh
Uttar Pradesh MLAs 2017–2022
Hindu Mahasabha politicians
Uttar Pradesh MLAs 2002–2007
Uttar Pradesh MLAs 2007–2012
Uttar Pradesh MLAs 2012–2017